Charles Grice "Lefty" Driesell (born December 25, 1931) is a retired American college basketball coach. He was the first coach to win more than 100 games at four different NCAA Division I schools, Driesell led the programs of Davidson College, the University of Maryland, James Madison University, and Georgia State University.  He earned a reputation as "the greatest program builder in the history of basketball."  At the time of his retirement in 2003, he was the fourth-winningest NCAA Division I men's basketball college coach, with 21 seasons of 20 or more wins, and 21 conference or conference tournament titles.  Driesell played college basketball at Duke University.

Early life
Driesell was born on December 25, 1931, in Norfolk, Virginia to Frank Driesell, a jeweler who had emigrated from Germany. In the fourth grade, Driesell received the nickname "Lefty" for his left  handedness. He attended Granby High School and quickly became a star on the basketball team. Driesell earned the city's most outstanding player trophy and All-State recognition while leading Granby to the Virginia State Basketball Championship.  He was named tournament MVP, totaling 59 points in three games.

After graduating high school in 1950, Driesell received a full scholarship to attend Duke University, where he played center on the basketball team under head coach Harold Bradley. Driesell graduated with a bachelor's degree in education in 1954.

Coaching career
After college in 1954, Driesell took an office job with Ford Motor Company. Driesell also found time to renew his playing career by joining the Virginia semi-pro ranks, where he once scored 59 points in a single game and earned a tryout with the then Minneapolis Lakers (later Los Angeles Lakers) of the National Basketball Association (NBA). He was also given a chance to enter the coaching profession when his prep alma mater offered him its junior varsity position for both football and basketball. After convincing his wife he could offset a significant pay cut by also selling World Book Encyclopedias part-time, he accepted the job and produced back-to-back unbeaten football teams and a city basketball champion in his first two years.

Driesell was promoted to varsity basketball coach in 1957, going 15–5 before moving to traditional in-state basketball power Newport News High School. There he inherited a team in the midst of a winning streak that he would build to a still-standing state record 57 straight. That unbeaten team won the Virginia Group I State Championship, besting his old Granby squad with four of his former starters.  His combined varsity record at the two schools was 97–15.

Davidson

Driesell served as the head coach at Davidson from 1960 to 1969. During his tenure his teams won three Southern Conference tournaments and five regular season championships, earning him the Southern Conference Sportswriters Association Coach of the Year award four years running from 1963 to 1966. An excellent recruiter at each of his collegiate coaching stops, Driesell landed Dick Snyder, a first round selection by the St. Louis Hawks. He cinched his wooing of college prospect Don Davidson by telling him "I'll put your name on the front [of your jersey]". When legendary NC State head coach Everett Case attempted to lure Driesell with an assistant position offer Lefty replied, "Coach, I got a better team than you got. Why would I do that?"

Maryland
Driesell was hired by the University of Maryland at College Park in 1969. During his introductory press conference on March 19, 1969, he famously and boldly stated that Maryland "has the potential to be the UCLA of the East Coast or I wouldn’t be here," referring to the nation's dominant college basketball program in the middle of a still unrivaled dynasty. While Driesell fell short of that overreaching goal, he was successful in leading the Terrapins to eight NCAA tournament appearances, a National Invitation Tournament (NIT) championship, two Atlantic Coast Conference regular season championships, and one Atlantic Coast Conference tournament championship. Maryland was ranked as high as No. 2 in the Associated Press rankings for four consecutive seasons from 1972 to 1976, and produced a number of All-Americans, including the Number 2 pick in the 1986 NBA draft, Len Bias.

Driesell coached the Maryland Terrapins from 1969 to 1986. In 1974, he signed a can't miss prospect sure to dominate college basketball, 6' 10" center Moses Malone. Instead, Malone opted to join the ABA Utah Stars, becoming the first modern era player to proceed directly from high school into professional basketball; by the time he retired, he'd become a 16-time ABA and NBA All-Star, three-time NBA MVP, and Naismith Basketball Hall of Famer.  Among other top names during Driesell's Maryland tenure are NBA stars Tom McMillen, Len Elmore, John Lucas, Albert King, Buck Williams Adrian Branch, and Len Bias. Bias was regarded by many at the time of his draft by the Boston Celtics as potentially as great or greater than fellow ACC legend at rival University of North Carolina Michael Jordan, then emerging as an NBA sensation.  He died tragically soon after the night of his selection.

At Maryland, Driesell began the now nationwide tradition of Midnight Madness. According to longstanding NCAA rules, college basketball teams were not permitted to begin practices until October 15. Driesell traditionally began the first practice with a requirement that his players run one mile in six minutes, but found that the players were too fatigued to practice effectively immediately afterwards. At 12:03 a.m. on October 15, 1971, Driesell held a one-mile run at the track around Byrd Stadium, where a crowd of 1,000 fans had gathered after learning of the unorthodox practice session. The event soon became a tradition to build excitement for the basketball team's upcoming season. Midnight Madness has been adopted by many national programs such as UNC, Kansas, Kentucky, Michigan State and Duke.

In 1972, Maryland defeated Niagara, 100–69 to secure the NIT championship. Driesell said that the season attained the three goals he had set for the program at the time of his hiring: "national prominence", "national ranking", and "a national championship".

On July 12, 1973, Driesell saved the lives of at least ten children from several burning buildings. He and two other men were surf fishing around midnight in Bethany Beach, Delaware when he saw flames coming from a seashore resort. Driesell broke down a door and rescued several children from the fire that eventually destroyed four townhouses. An eyewitness, Prince George's County circuit court Judge Samuel Meloy, said, "Let's face it, Driesell was a hero. There were no injuries and it was a miracle because firemen didn't come for at least 30 minutes." Driesell said, "Don't build me up as any kind of hero. All we did was try to get the kids out. It was just lucky that we were fishing right in front of the houses." For these actions, Driesell was awarded the NCAA Award of Valor.

In the 1974 ACC men's basketball tournament, Maryland was defeated by North Carolina State University in overtime 103–100, eliminating it from participating in that season's NCAA basketball tournament. Many consider it to be one of the greatest college basketball games of all time. NC State eventually went on to win the 1974 National Championship, with Maryland finishing No. 4 in the final Associated Press poll.  One great team knocking the other out of the NCAA Tournament prompted its officials to make a landmark decision the next year, expanding its field from 23 to 32 teams, thereby potentially opening the door for more than one team from a conference. Today, that field has been enlarged to 68 teams.

Later in 1974, Maryland represented the United States in the 1974 FIBA Intercontinental Cup that was held in Mexico. There, Driesell successfully led his team to the title after finishing with an unbeaten 5–0 record against Varese from Italy, Vila Nova from Brazil, Real Madrid from Spain, and Panteras de Aguascalientes and Dorados de Chihuahua from Mexico.

He had his detractors despite achieving a relative level of success at Maryland. Clemson head coach Tates Locke famously said about facing Driesell's Terrapins, "Keep me even until the last two minutes and I'll win." Paul Attner of The Washington Post wrote, "...Put him in a situation where players from both teams have equal ability and are prepared just as well, and he falls short much of the time. It is at these moments when it is glaringly apparent Driesell is not among that small number of coaches who can be called 'great'...Once Driesell is placed in a position where pressure decision-making, not hard work, produces a victory, he has problems."

In 1984, Driesell led the team to the school's second ACC Tournament Championship. In December 1985, the university gave Driesell a ten-year contract extension.  Earlier that same year, Driesell was made an Honorary M Club member.  On June 19, 1986, Terrapin star Len Bias died of a cocaine-induced heart attack. A subsequent investigation revealed that Bias had exhausted all his athletic eligibility yet was still 21 credits short of a degree. The circumstances surrounding Bias' death threw the University of Maryland and its athletics program into turmoil. An investigation revealed that Bias was 21 credits short of the graduation requirement despite having attended the university for four full years; in his final semester, he earned no academic credits, failing three courses and withdrawing from two others. On August 26, 1986, State's Attorney Arthur A. Marshall Jr. stated that in the hours after Bias' death, Driesell told players to remove drugs from Bias' dorm room. Two days later, Bias' father, James, accused the university and Driesell specifically of neglecting their athletes' academic status.

On October 29, Driesell resigned as head coach and took a position as an assistant athletic director. He also worked as a television analyst during college basketball games. Some members of the media widely described Driesell as a scapegoat of chancellor John B. Slaughter and the university administration.

James Madison
Driesell resumed his career as the head coach of the James Madison University Dukes in 1988, staying until 1996.  His teams captured five Colonial Athletic Association regular season championships, one tournament championship, and an appearance in the NCAA tournament.

Georgia State
Driesell then moved to Georgia State, which he led to four Atlantic Sun Conference regular season championships and one tournament championship in six years. He retired from coaching on January 3, 2003, in the middle of his 41st season as a head coach, ranked No. 4 in NCAA Division I wins behind only Dean Smith, Adolph Rupp, and Bob Knight. Driesell is the only basketball coach to win at least 100 games at four different colleges. Driesell led four of his squads to the NCAA Tournament's Elite Eight, but was unable to ever advance to its Final Four. Driesell's final record was 786–394.

Honors and awards
Driesell earned conference Coach of the Year honors at each of his destinations. He was named the Southern Conference Coach of the Year four times at Davidson (1963–1966), twice named the Atlantic Coast Conference Coach of the Year at Maryland (1975 and 1980), twice named the Colonial Athletic Association Coach of the Year at James Madison (1990 and 1992), and once named the Atlantic Sun Conference Coach of the Year at Georgia State (2001).

Driesell was awarded the NCAA Award of Valor for helping save lives from a July 12, 1973 structure fire.

In 1995, Driesell was inducted into the Virginia Sports Hall of Fame. On April 2, 2007, Driesell was inducted as a member of the second class of the National Collegiate Basketball Hall of Fame. The University of Maryland Athletic Hall of Fame inducted Driesell in 2002. On August 13, 2008, he was inducted as a member of the inaugural class of the Hampton Roads Sports Hall of Fame, which honors athletes, coaches, and administrators who made contributions to sports in southeastern Virginia. On May 25, 2011, Driesell was inducted into the Southern Conference Hall of Fame.

In 2003, Georgia State University dedicated their basketball court to Driesell.

On April 2, 2010, the first annual Lefty Driesell Award for the best defensive player in NCAA Division I basketball was bestowed upon its first recipient, Jarvis Varnado of Mississippi State.

In February 2017, the University of Maryland hung a banner in the Xfinity Center to honor his career at the university. Lefty accepted the honor alongside of numerous former players, assistant coaches, and family.

Driesell was nominated numerous times for the Basketball Hall of Fame, receiving wide support from contemporaries. In 2018, Driesell was selected for induction into the Hall of Fame.  He was formally inducted on September 7, 2018.

Personal life
While a student at Duke University, Driesell eloped with his wife, Joyce on December 14, 1952. The two had met while in the ninth and eighth grades, respectively. The couple has four children. His son, Chuck, was hired as an assistant on the Maryland coaching staff under Gary Williams in 2006, and served from 2010 to 2015, as the head basketball coach at The Citadel. Chuck also served as an assistant for his father, while at JMU. While coaching under his father, saw firsthand just how hard his dad worked. "Dad gave me a lot of responsibility, and we worked hard. As a son and as a player, I'm not sure I understood how hard he worked. I figured it out pretty quickly." Chuck is currently the head coach at the Maret School in Washington, D.C.

Driesell is a Presbyterian, but has often attended churches affiliated with other Christian denominations. One of his three daughters, Pam, is a pastor at Trinity Presbyterian Church in Atlanta. In 2003, Driesell retired to Virginia Beach, Virginia with his wife.

Head coaching record

College

See also
 List of college men's basketball coaches with 600 wins

References

External links
Georgia State bio (archived from 2002)
College playing statistics

1931 births
Living people
American men's basketball players
American people of German descent
American Presbyterians
Basketball coaches from Virginia
Basketball players from Norfolk, Virginia
College men's basketball head coaches in the United States
Davidson Wildcats men's basketball coaches
Duke Blue Devils men's basketball players
Georgia State Panthers men's basketball coaches
High school basketball coaches in the United States
James Madison Dukes men's basketball coaches
Maryland Terrapins athletic directors
Maryland Terrapins men's basketball coaches
Naismith Memorial Basketball Hall of Fame inductees
National Collegiate Basketball Hall of Fame inductees
Sportspeople from Norfolk, Virginia
Centers (basketball)